Rush Prudential HMO, Inc. v. Moran, 536 U.S. 355 (2002), was a decision by the Supreme Court of the United States, which ruled that the federal Employee Retirement Income Security Act (ERISA) did not preempt an Illinois medical-review statute.

ERISA envisions a national standard for welfare and pension plans so state laws which "relate to" ERISA plans are preempted under Section 514 of ERISA.  However, ERISA contains a "savings" clause which saves state laws which regulate insurance under Section 514(b).  The statute at issue in Moran regulated insurance, which is one of the functions HMOs perform. Although HMOs provide healthcare as well as insurance, the statute does not require choosing a single or primary function of an HMO. Congress has long recognized that HMOs are risk-bearing organizations subject to state regulation. Finally, allowing States to regulate the insurance aspects of HMOs will not interfere with the desire of Congress for uniform national standards under ERISA.

See also
 List of United States Supreme Court cases, volume 536
List of United States Supreme Court cases

References

External links
 

United States Supreme Court cases
United States Supreme Court cases of the Rehnquist Court
Employee Retirement Income Security Act of 1974
2002 in United States case law
Prudential Financial